Thomas Boyd (7 January 1888 – 29 November 1952) was an Irish-American professional golfer who played in the early-to-mid 20th century. His best U.S. Open finish was T20 in 1925 and his best PGA Championship effort came in 1921 when he finished T9.

Early life
Boyd was born on 7 January 1888 in Armagh in what is now Northern Ireland. Little is known of his early life although like contemporaries from his era he likely first started as a caddie and progressed to a career as a professional golfer from there. He also learned, as did almost all pro golfers in the early 20th century, to make golf clubs from scratch.

Golf career
Boyd emigrated to the United States in 1915. He served as the head professional of the Fox Hills Golf Club in Stapleton, New York. Boyd had several fine finishes in both the U.S. Open and the PGA Championship. His best tournament was the 1921 PGA Championship when he reached the round of 16, eventually placing in a tie for 9th place. He defeated Eddie Towns in a first round match by default. He then lost in a second round match to Walter Hagen by the score of 6 and 5. He won once on the PGA Tour, in 1925.

Memorable matches
Boyd was involved in a memorable match on October 6, 1918 at Fox Hills Golf Club when he was paired with Jerome Travers to win 1 up after an extra hole to break a tie. They defeated the opposing amateur pair of A. Lucien Walker, Jr. and A. F. Kammer. The charity match raised $1,000 for the American Red Cross which used the funds to support the war effort during World War I.

In an even more high-profile match held on July 23, 1920 at Fox Hills, Boyd and George Fotheringham went up against the very formidable pair of Harry Vardon, then the 6-time Open Championship winner, and his partner Ted Ray. The touring British duo – who seldom lost matches – triumphed in this match as well. Ray was in particularly good form in 1920; just more than a month after the Boyd/Fotheringham match he won the U.S. Open at Inverness Club.

Death and legacy
Boyd died in 1952. He is best remembered as a touring golf professional with a number of good finishes in golf major championships.

Results in major championships

Note: Boyd never played in the Masters Tournament or The Open Championship.

NYF = Tournament not yet founded
NT = No tournament
DNP = Did not play
T = Tied for a place
? = Unknown
R64, R32, R16, QF, SF = Round in which player lost in PGA Championship match play
Yellow background for top-10

Source:

References

Irish male golfers
PGA Tour golfers
Golfers from New York (state)
People from Armagh (city)
1888 births
1952 deaths